USS PGM-2 was a PGM-1 class motor gunboat that served in the United States Navy during World War II.  She was originally laid down as an SC-497 class submarine chaser on 16 July 1942 by the Robinson Marine in Benton Harbor, Michigan and launched on 17 June 1943.  She was commissioned as USS SC-757 on 12 August 1943.  She was later converted to a PGM-1 class motor gunboat and renamed PGM-2 on 10 December 1943.  After the war she was sold and transferred to the Foreign Liquidations Commission at Subic Bay, Philippines on 20 May 1947.  Her exact fate is unknown.

See also
 Other ships built by Robinson Marine in Benton Harbor, Michigan:
 USC&GS Hilgard (ASV 82)
 USC&GS Wainwright (ASV 83)

References
Motor Gunboat/Patrol Gunboat Photo Archive: PGM-2
USS SC-757 (SC-757)
USS SC-757, 1943-1947. Later PGM-2
see PGM-3 for service details

PGM-1-class motor gunboats
Ships built in Benton Harbor, Michigan
1943 ships
World War II gunboats of the United States